Chapayevsky is a rural locality (a settlement) in Grayvoronsky District, Belgorod Oblast, Russia. The population was 377 as of 2010. There are 5 streets.

Geography 
Chapayevsky is located 19 km east of Grayvoron (the district's administrative centre) by road. Khotmyzhsk is the nearest rural locality.

References 

Rural localities in Grayvoronsky District